Paducah High School or Paducah School is a public high school located in Paducah, Texas (USA) and classified as a 1A school by the UIL. It is part of the Paducah Independent School District which serves all students in Cottle County. In 2013, the school was rated "Met Standard" by the Texas Education Agency.

Athletics
The Paducah Dragons compete in the following sports 

Basketball
Cross Country
6-Man Football
Golf
Tennis
Track and Field
Volleyball
Cheerleading

State Titles
Boys Basketball 
1987(1A), 1988(1A), 2011(1A/D1)
Boys Track 
1996(1A) 2019 (1A)
Girls Track 
1976(1A), 1977(1A)
Spirit UIL Competition
2019-2020(1A), 2018-2019(1A), 2017-2018(1A), 2016-2017(1A), 2015-2016(1A)

References

External links
Paducah ISD
List of Six-man football stadiums in Texas

Education in Cottle County, Texas
Public high schools in Texas
Public middle schools in Texas
Public elementary schools in Texas